Jemmape  was a department of the First French Republic and of the First French Empire in present-day Belgium. It was named after the Battle of Jemappes, fought between the French and the Austrians in 1792 near the village of Jemappes, near Mons. Jemappes was spelled Jemmape, Jemmapes or Jemmappes at the time. Its territory corresponded more or less with that of the Belgian province of Hainaut. It was firstly created on 2 March 1793, and then recreated on 1 October 1795, when the Austrian Netherlands and the Prince-Bishopric of Liège were officially annexed by the French Republic. Before annexation, its territory lay in the County of Hainaut, Tournai and the Tournaisis, the County of Namur (Charleroi) and the Bishopric of Liège (Thuin).

The Chef-lieu of the department was Mons. The department was subdivided into the following three arrondissements and cantons:
 Mons: Boussu, Chièvres, Dour, Enghien, Lens, Le Roeulx, Mons (2 cantons), Pâturages and Soignies.
 Charleroi: Beaumont, Binche, Charleroi (2 cantons), Chimay, Fontaine-l'Évêque, Gosselies, Merbes-le-Château, Seneffe and Thuin.
 Tournai: Antoing, Ath, Celles, Ellezelles, Frasnes, Lessines, Leuze, Péruwelz, Quevaucamps, Templeuve and Tournai (2 cantons).

After Napoleon was defeated in 1814, the department was dissolved and later it became part of the United Kingdom of the Netherlands as the province of Hainaut.

Administration

Prefects
The Prefect was the highest state representative in the department.

Secretaries-General
The Secretary-General was the deputy to the Prefect.

Subprefects of Charleroi

Subprefects of Mons
The office of Subprefect of Mons was held by the Prefect until 1811.

Subprefects of Tournai

References

Former departments of France in Belgium
French First Republic
1795 establishments in France
History of Hainaut